Bruno Ibeh  (born April 15, 1995) is a Nigerian footballer who plays as a midfielder.

Career
Ibeh joined Uruguayan side Nacional in 2014, where he played in the third division with the club's B team. At the beginning of the 2015–16 season, as Gustavo Munúa was appointed the club's new coach, Ibeh was called to train with the first team for the pre-season. On 6 October 2015, he was sent on a one-year loan to second division Club Atlético Torque.

After leaving Nacional, Ibeh joined Sud América where he would make five  first division   appearances. Having played sparingly during his time in Uruguay, Ibeh moved to Israel where he would play for Hapoel Acre F.C. and Beitar Jerusalem F.C.

References

External links

1995 births
Living people
Nigerian footballers
Nigerian expatriate footballers
Association football midfielders
Club Nacional de Football players
Montevideo City Torque players
Sud América players
Hapoel Acre F.C. players
Beitar Jerusalem F.C. players
NK Domžale players
FC Taraz players
Uruguayan Primera División players
Israeli Premier League players
Kazakhstan Premier League players
Expatriate footballers in Uruguay
Expatriate footballers in Israel
Expatriate footballers in Slovenia
Expatriate footballers in Kazakhstan
Nigerian expatriate sportspeople in Uruguay
Nigerian expatriate sportspeople in Israel
Nigerian expatriate sportspeople in Slovenia
Nigerian expatriate sportspeople in Kazakhstan
People from Owerri
Sportspeople from Imo State